Kalanchyovskaya is a railway station of Line D2 of the Moscow Central Diameters in Moscow. Currently it is under reconstruction which will be finished in 2023.

Gallery

References

Railway stations in Moscow
Railway stations of Moscow Railway
Railway stations in the Russian Empire opened in 1865
Line D2 (Moscow Central Diameters) stations